Elinor Ochs is an American linguistic anthropologist, and Distinguished Professor of Anthropology at University of California, Los Angeles. Ochs has conducted fieldwork in Madagascar, Italy, Samoa and the United States of America on communication and interaction. Together with Bambi Schieffelin, Professor Ochs developed language socialization, a field of inquiry which examines the ways in which individuals become competent members of communities of practice to and through the use of language. Professor Ochs is also known for her contributions to applied linguistics and the theorization of narrative and family discourse.

In the USA, Professor Ochs has conducted research on a wide range of topics including the social construction of knowledge in a physics laboratory, sociality and autism, and the socialization of morality in family discourse. The last was conducted during her decade long tenure as the director for the Center on Everyday Lives of Families, supported by the Alfred P. Sloan Foundation’s Workplace, Workforce, and Working Families Program on Dual-Career Working Middle Class Families.   In 1998, Professor Ochs was named a MacArthur Fellow for her contributions to the study of language.

Awards
 2000 Honorary Doctorate, Linkoping University, Sweden
 1998 MacArthur Fellows Program
 1998 American Academy of Arts and Sciences Fellow
 1996 Helsinki University Rector’s Medal of Distinctive Scholarship
 1984 John Simon Guggenheim Memorial Foundation Fellow
 1973 New Hall, University of Cambridge Fellow
 1973 Honorary master's degree, University of Cambridge
 1966 Phi Beta Kappa

Works
The Handbook of Language Socialization, Editors, Alessandro Duranti, Elinor Ochs, Bambi B. Schieffelin, Malden, MA:Wiley-Blackwell, 2011. 
Living narrative: creating lives in everyday storytelling, Authors Elinor Ochs, Lisa Capps, Harvard University Press, 2001, 
Constructing panic: the discourse of agoraphobia, Authors Lisa Capps, Elinor Ochs, Harvard University Press, 1997, 
Interaction and grammar, Editors Elinor Ochs, Emanuel A. Schegloff, Sandra A. Thompson, Cambridge University Press, 1996, 
Culture and language development: Language acquisition and language socialization in a Samoan village, Elinor Ochs, Cambridge: Cambridge University Press.  
	Language socialization across cultures, Editors Bambi B. Schieffelin, Elinor Ochs, Cambridge University Press, 1986, 
Acquisition of conversational competence, Authors Elinor Ochs, Bambi B. Schieffelin, London: Routledge, 1983, Kegan and Paul 
Developmental pragmatics, Editors Elinor Ochs, Bambi Schieffelin, New York: Academic Press, 1979.

References

American anthropologists
University of California, Los Angeles faculty
MacArthur Fellows
Living people
Year of birth missing (living people)
Fellows of the American Academy of Arts and Sciences
Presidents of the American Association for Applied Linguistics